Matej Kazár (born 10 May 1983) is a Slovak biathlete. He competed in the 2006, the 2014 Winter Olympics, and the 2018 Winter Olympics for Slovakia where he finished 37th in the 2014 sprint.

References

External links
 
 
 
 

1983 births
Living people
Sportspeople from Košice
Slovak male biathletes
Biathletes at the 2006 Winter Olympics
Biathletes at the 2014 Winter Olympics
Biathletes at the 2018 Winter Olympics
Olympic biathletes of Slovakia
Universiade medalists in biathlon
Universiade bronze medalists for Slovakia
Competitors at the 2011 Winter Universiade